Robert Wynne (1622–1675) was a Virginia politician and landowner. He was one of the men representing Charles City County in the House of Burgesses from 1658 until 1675, and in 1658 and during the Colony's "Long Parliament" fellow burgesses selected him as their Speaker 1662–74. This was the second longest tenure of any Speaker.

Wynne was born in Canterbury, England, being baptized there on December 22, 1622. His grandfather, also Robert Wynne, had been mayor of Canterbury in 1599, and other relatives had served in Parliament.

He settled in Charles City County, Virginia, in early 1656, though he may have arrived in Virginia earlier. He served on the county court, though he was fined for poor attendance in September 1659. He also did not serve as a burgess in that year's assembly, though he did the years before and after.

The House of Burgesses called by Sir William Berkeley in 1661 continued without dissolving until 1676, meeting in seventeen sessions during that period. At the second session in 1662, Wynne was elected as Speaker to replace Henry Soane, who had died during the recess. Under Wynne's leadership, the House took an active role in business previously left to the Governor and Council, creating a standing committee to advise the Governor between sessions.

Wynne died in 1675; his will was dated July 1.

References

1622 births
1675 deaths
Speakers of the Virginia House of Burgesses
People from Charles City County, Virginia
People from Canterbury
English emigrants